Synaphea preissii is a shrub endemic to Western Australia.

It blooms between July and November producing yellow flowers.

It is found in the Great Southern regions of Western Australia where it grows in sandy-loamy soils often with gravel.

References

Eudicots of Western Australia
preissii
Endemic flora of Western Australia
Plants described in 1845